The 2019–20 Ohio Bobcats women's basketball team represented Ohio University during the 2019–20 NCAA Division I women's basketball season. The Bobcats, led by seventh year head coach Bob Boldon, played its home games at the Convocation Center in Athens, Ohio as a member of the Mid-American Conference.

They finished the season 19–11, 11–7 in MAC play. They advanced to the semi-final game of the MAC women's tournament before the tournament was cancelled due to the start of the COVID-19 pandemic.

Offseason

Departures

Incoming transfers

2019 recruiting class

Preseason
The preseason coaches' poll and league awards were announced by the league office on October 30, 2019.  Ohio was unanimously picked to finish first in the MAC East.

Preseason women's basketball coaches poll
(First place votes in parenthesis)

East Division
 Ohio (12) 72
 Buffalo 56
  50 
  32 
  28 
  14

West Division
  60 (4)
  59 (4)
  50 (2)
  35 (1)
 Ball State 30 (1)
  18

Tournament Champs
Ohio (10), Buffalo (1), Northern Illinois (1)

Preseason All-MAC 

Source

Award watch lists

Roster

Schedule

|-
!colspan=9 style=| Exhibition

|-
!colspan=9 style=| Non-conference regular season

|-
!colspan=9 style=| MAC regular season

|-
!colspan=9 style=| MAC Women's Tournament

Awards and honors

Weekly Awards

All-MAC Awards

Source

See also
2019–20 Ohio Bobcats men's basketball team

References

Ohio
Ohio Bobcats women's basketball seasons
Ohio Bobcats women's basketball
Ohio Bobcats women's basketball